Pürevjavyn Temüüjin (born 2 June 1994), also Purevjavyn Temujin, is a Mongolian taekwondo athlete and Asian Games gold medal winner.

He is the first Mongolian taekwondo athlete to compete at the Olympics, debuting at the 2016 Summer Olympics in Rio de Janeiro, in the men's 68 kg.

References

External links

1994 births
Living people
Mongolian male taekwondo practitioners
Olympic taekwondo practitioners of Mongolia
Taekwondo practitioners at the 2016 Summer Olympics
Taekwondo practitioners at the 2014 Asian Games
Taekwondo practitioners at the 2018 Asian Games
Asian Games competitors for Mongolia
Sportspeople from Ulaanbaatar
21st-century Mongolian people
20th-century Mongolian people